Haya bint Saad Al Sudairi ( Hayā bint Saʿad Āl Sudayrī; 1913 – 18 April 2003) was one of the spouses of King Abdulaziz of Saudi Arabia. She was a member of the powerful Sudairi family. Her elder sister, Al Jawhara bint Saad, married Abdulaziz and had three sons and a daughter with him. Following the death of Al Jawhara in 1927, Haya married Abdulaziz. Their marriage produced five children: Princess Hessa, Princess Meshail, Prince Badr, Prince Abdul Majid and Prince Abdul Illah. 

On 7 February 1999 as part of the centennial celebrations of Riyadh's capture by Abdulaziz an interview with Haya bint Saad was published in Al Jazirah, a Saudi Arabian newspaper. She argued "whatever has been and will be said about the King [Abdulaziz] cannot reflect the [whole] truth."

Haya bint Saad died at age 90 in Riyadh on 18 April 2003. She was buried in the Al Oud cemetery there.

References

Haya
1913 births
2003 deaths
Haya
Princesses by marriage
Haya
Haya